Bolusia is a genus of flowering plants in the family Fabaceae. It belongs to the subfamily Faboideae. It is found only in southern Africa.

References

Crotalarieae
Fabaceae genera